KF Luftëtari, also known as Luftëtari FC or simply Luftëtari was an Albanian football club based in Gjirokastër, southern Albania. The club was founded on  1926 as Shqiponja Gjirokastër and has played at its home ground, the Gjirokastra Stadium, since 1973. They last competed in the Kategoria Superiore, the first tier of football in the country.

History

Early history
The club was founded in 1926 under the name Shqiponja Gjirokastër. It underwent many subsequent name changes over the years: Gjirokastër (1949), Puna Gjirokastër (1951), Luftëtari Gjirokastër (1958), Shqiponja Gjirokastër (1992) and to its current name Luftëtari Gjirokastër in 2002.

During the Communist Albania Luftetari was deemed to have a good football academy, which provided for several national team players, such as Theodhori Kalluci, Sefedin Braho, Lefter Millo, Arjan Xhumba, Arjan Bellaj, Altin Haxhi, and Gjergji Kalluci.

Luftëtari finished as the league runner-up in the 1977–78 season, their highest achievement ever.

Final years and collapse
On 2 July 2015 Mustafa Hysi was appointed as the club's head coach Gentian Nora as general sport director  of the 2015–16 Albanian Superliga season, with the aim of achieving promotion back to the Albanian Superliga.

Luftëtari were promoted back to Albanian Superliga after a three-year absence as they defeated Apolonia Fier on the last matchday of the regular season in Group B of the Albanian First Division. They then faced Group A winners Korabi Peshkopi in the championship final at the Qemal Stafa Stadium on 19 May 2016, where they clinched their 8th First Division title as they won 11–10 in a penalty shootout that saw 24 penalties being taken following a goalless draw and extra time.  Making a surprise performance in 2016-2017 season Luftetari finished in 4th Position after more than 20 years with Mladen Milinkovic as Head coach and Gentian Nora as General and Sport Director  By finishing third in the Albanian Superliga 2017–18 season with Hasan Lika as Head coach and Gentian Nora as Sport  Director, they will make its debut in the 2018-19 UEFA Europa League season.

The club collapsed in 2020 due to financial mismanagement and players were leaving the club to pursue careers elsewhere. A new team was established and named AF Luftëtari which had to start at the third tier of Albanian football.

Stadium

The club plays its home games at the Gjirokastra Stadium, which was built in 1973 and is located near the centre of Gjirokastër and holds 8,400 spectators. Following Luftëtari's promotion back to the Albanian Superliga in 2016, the stadium required a complete renovation in order to meet the necessary requirements to host home games in the top flight. Work on the stadium began in August 2016 and the surface was to be replaced and plastic seats were to be installed throughout the stadium. The first stage of the reconstruction was completed in November 2016, which meant that the stadium was able to host Albanian Superliga games once again. The first stage consisted of replacing the playing surface, the installation of 300 plastic seats in the main stand, the installation of CCTV as well as the refurbishment of the changing room for both players and officials. The cost of the work carried out totalled 15,000,000 Albanian lek, around €110,000 at the time, and it was a joint investment by the Municipality of Gjirokastër, the Albanian Football Association as well as the club's owner Grigor Tavo. The first game of the 2016–17 season to take place at the stadium came against Partizani which ended 1–1 with around 7,000 fans in attendance.

Honours

Major trophies
League
Kategoria Superiore
 Runners-up (1): 1977–78

Kategoria e Parë (Tier 2)
 Winners (8): 1934, 1962–63, 1965–66, 1974–75, 1988–89, 1993–94, 1998–99, 2015–16
 Runners-up (2): 1954, 1960

Minor trophies
Zëri i Popullit Cup
 Winners (1): 1977

Bashkimi Cup
 Winners (1): 1983

Zëri i Rinisë Cup
 Winners (1): 1982

Shtypi Popullor Shqiptar Cup
 Winners (1): 1977

50th Anniversary of Football in Albania Cup
 Winners (1): 1963

European record

As of 12 July 2018

Notes
 QR: Qualifying round

Current squad

Other players under contract

Out on loan

Historical list of coaches

 Adem Karapici
 Bahri Ishka
 Hito Hitaj (1978-1991)
 Dhori Kalluci (1993-1994)
 Hito Hitaj (1994-1995)
 Mustafa Hysi (1995-1996)
 Kristaq Ciko (1997)
 Mustafa Hysi (1997-1999)
 Faruk Sejdini (1999-2000)
 Hysen Dedja (2000)
 Mustafa Hysi (2001)
 Mihal Çoni (2001)
 Ruzhdi Lamaj (2001-2002)
 Andrea Marko (2002)
 Mihal Çabi (2002-2003)
 Andrea Çulli (2002-2003)
 Arben Kumbulla (2003-2004)
 Mustafa Hysi ( – 30 Aug 2006)
 Ilir Spahiu (30 Aug 2006 – 12 Mar 2007)
 Mustafa Hysi (12 Mar 2007 – 8 Apr 2007)
 Edi Martini (8 Apr 2007 – Jun 2007)
 Andrea Çulli (2007 - 2008)
 Mustafa Hysi (Jul 2011 – 31 Dec 2011)
 Nevil Dede (1 Jan 2012 – 28 Oct 2012)
 Edi Martini (28 Oct 2012 - 1 Apr 2013)
 Arjan Bellaj (1 Apr 2013 – Oct 2013)
 Petraq Bifsha (2013 - 2014)
 Bledar Devolli (8 Jul 2014 - 8 Feb 2015)
 Vladimir Gjoni (Mar 2015 - May 2015)
 Mustafa Hysi (Aug 2015 - 29 Feb 2016)
 Gerd Haxhiu (29 Feb 2016 – May 2016)
 Mladen Milinković (Jul 2016 - Jun 2017)
 Daniel Fernández (Aug 2017 - Oct 2017)
 Hasan Lika (Oct 2017 - May 2018)
 Miloš Kostić (1 Jul 2018 - 19 Sep 2018)
 Gentian Mezani (19 Sep 2018 - 28 Jan 2019)
 Julian Ahmataj (29 Jan 2019 - 1 June 2019)
 Klodian Duro (3 June 2019 - 23 Sep 2019 )
 Georgios Marantas (24 Sep 2019 - 14 Dec 2019 )
 Neritan Novi (15 Dec 2019 - 5 Jan 2020 )
 Nikolin Çoçlli (6 Jan 2020  -  )

Presidents

References

Gjirokastër
Defunct football clubs in Albania
Association football clubs established in 1929
Association football clubs disestablished in 2020
1929 establishments in Albania
2020 disestablishments in Albania
Luftëtari Gjirokastër